The Very Beast of Dio Vol. 2 is a posthumous compilation album by American heavy metal band Dio. It is a followup to The Very Beast of Dio, a compilation album released in 2000 featuring tracks from Dio's first six studio albums and live EP. Vol. 2 picks up where the previous album left off, including tracks from the band's seventh through tenth studio albums.

Unlike its predecessor, which was only available in the United States and Canada, Vol. 2 had a worldwide release. The album was released on October 9, 2012.

Promotion
Eddie Trunk, radio host and longtime friend of Ronnie James Dio, provided liner notes for the release. In addition, the album was heavily promoted on Trunk's radio program as well as his VH1 Classic program, That Metal Show.

The album was made available for streaming on the official Ronnie James Dio webstore on August 7, 2012.

Reception

Since its release, this compilation album has been met with mostly positive reviews. William Clark of Guitar International wrote that "This new release captures both of these of extreme emotions that drenched Dio’s later efforts and brings them together fabulously on one disc". Chad Bowar of About.com said that "The Very Beast Of Dio Vol 2 isn't essential, but is a very good collection of Dio's later material".

Track listing

Credits
Ronnie James Dio - vocals, keyboards
Tracy G - guitars on tracks 7, 10, 15
Craig Goldy - guitars on track 3, 6, 8, 9, 11, 12, 14, 17
Doug Aldrich - guitars on track 1, 2, 4, 5, 13
David "Rock" Feinstein - guitars on track 16
Jeff Pilson - bass on tracks 3, 7, 9, 11, 15, 17, keyboards on tracks 3, 9, 11, 17
Larry Dennison - bass on track 10
Jimmy Bain - bass on tracks 1, 2, 4, 5, 6, 8, 12, 14
Rudy Sarzo - bass on track 13
Garry Bordonaro - bass on track 16
Simon Wright - drums
Vinny Appice - drums on tracks 7, 10 and 15
Carl Canedy - drums on track 16
Scott Warren - keyboards
All tracks produced by Ronnie James Dio and engineered by Wyn Davis, except:
"Metal Will Never Die" - produced by David Feinstein and mixed by Alex Perialas
"Hunter of the Heart" (live) - engineered by Moray McMillan and Martin Rowe
Wyn Davis - remastering
Wendy Dio - executive producer

References

Dio (band) albums
2012 greatest hits albums